Mohammad Jahangir Alam Talukdar (born 4 December 1968) is a former Bangladeshi cricketer who played in two One Day Internationals in 1990.

A left-arm fast bowler (commonly called Dulu) he first played for Bangladesh side in a three-day match against Pakistan in January 1986. But it was only from the 1989–90 season that he started to appear regularly in international level. His 3/29 helped BCCB (White) defeat the Indian team Deccan Blues at Mymensingh in January 1990. He was a key performer in the 4th ICC Trophy tournament in Netherlands in 1990. There he shared the new ball with another left-arm fast bowler, Gholam Nousher. Dulu's best performance came in the second round. His 3/27 against Denmark and 2/24 against Canada helped Bangladesh win vital matches. In December 1992, Dulu took 3/19 against Sri Lanka A, at Dhaka, in the 1st SAARC cricket tournament. He also played in the 5th ICC Trophy tournament in Kenya.

Apart from being a fast medium bowler, Jahangir Alam Talukdar was an unorthodox but effective lower-order right-hand batsman.

References

1968 births
Living people
Bangladesh One Day International cricketers
Bangladeshi cricketers
Biman Bangladesh Airlines cricketers
20th-century Bangladeshi cricketers
Cricketers from Dhaka